In taxonomy, the Desulfurococcaceae are a family of the disc-shaped anaerobic microorganisms belonging to the order Desulfurococcales, in the domain Archaea.  Members of this family are distinguished from the other family (Pyrodictiaceae) in the order Desulfurococcales by having an optimal growth temperature below 100 °C, rather than above 100 °C, and by being more diverse.  Several genera of the family have been identified.

Phylogeny
The currently accepted taxonomy is based on the List of Prokaryotic names with Standing in Nomenclature (LPSN) and National Center for Biotechnology Information (NCBI).

References

Further reading

Scientific journals

Scientific books

Scientific databases

External links

Archaea taxonomic families
Thermoproteota